"Emotions" is a song recorded by American singer-songwriter Mariah Carey for her second studio album of the same name (1991). It was written and produced by Carey, Robert Clivillés, and David Cole of C+C Music Factory and released as the album's lead single on August 13, 1991. The song's lyrics has its protagonist going through a variety of emotions from high to low, up to the point where she declares, "You got me feeling emotions." Musically, it is a gospel and R&B song heavily influenced by 1970s disco music and showcases Carey's upper range and extensive use of the whistle register.

"Emotions" received positive reviews from music critics, who mainly praised Carey's vocal performance. The song became Carey's fifth consecutive number one song in the United States, topping the Billboard Hot 100 for three weeks, making her the first (and till date) the only act to have their first five singles top the chart. Internationally, it was a moderate success, topping the Canadian Singles Chart, and reaching the top 10 in Greece, Netherlands, and New Zealand. It received a nomination for the Grammy Award for Best Female Pop Vocal Performance at the 34th Annual ceremony.

Background
Carey was sent to work with the C+C Music Factory and they composed the song "You're So Cold", which became the first choice for the album's first single. However, a second session with the production team had them feeling in a lighter mood when "Emotions" was created and finally decided upon as the lead single.

Composition

"Emotions" is a "new-disco" song with a "moderate dance tempo" of 116 beats per minute. Carey's vocal range spans four octaves and four semitones on the track, from C3 to E7, with the highest note being sung with arpeggios.

It was later publicly revealed that the track borrowed from Maurice White's "Best of My Love", written for the band The Emotions. This situation led to an out-of-court settlement between both sides.

Music videos and remixes
The single's music video, directed by Jeff Preiss, features Carey and friends with exotic animals while partying and having fun around town in New York City. The video was desaturated but still maintains various color tints, which change from brown to red to blue and so forth. On July 31, 2020, the music video was re-released in a remastered form, in HD quality.
David Cole and Robert Clivillés created the main remix of "Emotions", known as "Emotions" (12" Club Mix). Although Carey did not re-record her vocals for it, she added a new gospel-style intro before the song's dance portion. This new intro was used when she performed "Emotions" on MTV Unplugged in 1992, as well as at some later concerts. A music video was created using the 12" club mix, but only slight changes in editing differentiate it from the video for the original version. The remix was later featured on Carey's 2003 remix album The Remixes.

Canadian rapper Drake sampled the song's 12" Club Mix version in the song "Emotionless" from his 2018 album Scorpion. On July 31, 2020, along with the celebration of the 30th anniversary of her debut studio album Mariah Carey, as well as Carey celebrating 30 years in the music industry, she released the song as a five track extended play, titled Emotions EP, which contains some remixes from both the US and European CD maxi singles.

Reception

Critical reception

"Emotions" received positive reviews from critics. About.com's Bill Lamb called the high notes as the pros of the album itself and that it stands with Mariah's best. AllMusic editor Ashley S. Battel highlighted the song and wrote that it is upbeat and it serves to send the listener on a musical journey filled with varying emotions. Billboard editor Larry Flick said, "Although the heat generated by her multiplatinum debut album has barely cooled, Carey previews her sophomore set with a dance /pop ditty that will remind some of the Emotions' "Best of my Love". Expect instant multiformat attention." Henderson and DeVaney from Cashbox described it as "a happy, perky soul/pop number bearing a resemblance to the music the group The Emotions embraced during the 1970s". Chicago Tribune editor Jan DeKnock wrote "just listen to those incredibly high notes on the title cut and current single 'Emotions.'" 

A reviewer from Los Angeles Times wrote that this song's producers somewhat perk up this song but he noted that the song can't match the quality of any C+C material. Pan-European magazine Music & Media said it "is a good display of Carey's impressive vocal gymnastics. A fashionable co-production by Cole and Clivilles (C&C Music Factory) is paired to a gospel-tinged pop groove." Music Weeks reviewer called it a "dynamic gospel/R&B-inflected house track". Rolling Stone writer Rob Tannenbaum also said, "they (producers) back Carey with pumping house keyboards and shamelessly recycle the chords of Cheryl Lynn's 'Got to Be Real' and the Emotions' 'Best of My Love' to construct the bubbly new-disco 'Emotions.'" Sun Sentinel magazine editor Deborah Wiler wrote that "the unimaginative first single, Emotions, sounds suspiciously like the `77 hit Best of My Love (by the Emotions)."

Accolades
"Emotions" was nominated for the 1992 Grammy Award for Best Pop Vocal Performance, Female, losing to "Something to Talk About" by Bonnie Raitt. It won a BMI R&B Award, continuing Carey's unbroken streak of wins for this award. Carey was also nominated for Producer of the Year (non-classical), becoming the second woman to achieve this honor.

Chart performance
"Emotions" became Carey's fifth consecutive number one hit on the US Billboard Hot 100, giving her the distinction of being the first (and, to date, only) act to have their first five singles make number 1 on the Hot 100, breaking the 21-year record previously held by The Jackson 5.  It reached number 1 in its seventh week and spent three weeks at the top, from October 12 to 26, 1991. It replaced "Good Vibrations" by Marky Mark and the Funky Bunch featuring Loleatta Holloway and was replaced by Karyn White's "Romantic". It remained in the top 40 for 20 weeks and was one of four singles from Carey on the Hot 100's 1991 year-end chart, ranking 22. The song topped the Hot R&B/Hip-Hop Songs chart and became her second number one single on the Hot Dance Club Play chart. The RIAA certified it Platinum in 2019.

Outside the United States, it was Carey's most successful single since "Vision of Love" (1990), the lead single from her debut album. It topped the charts in Canada, becoming Carey's third chart-topper in the country. It also reached the top-five in Greece and New Zealand, and became her first single to reach the United Kingdom top 20 since her debut. It was a modest hit in Australia, where it just missed the top ten, but its success in Europe was limited.

Live performances
Carey performed "Emotions" live for the first time at the 1991 MTV Video Music Awards, backed by several male and female back up vocalists. Following the award show appearance, she sang "Emotions" on The Arsenio Hall Show, airing on September 23, 1991. Carey opened every show with "Emotions" during her Music Box Tour in 1993, Daydream World Tour in 1996, Butterfly World Tour in 1998, and Rainbow World Tour in 2000. However, she omitted the second verse in it when performing the song during the Rainbow World Tour. On New Year's Eve 2009, Carey sang "Emotions" on the first night of her Angels Advocate Tour (2009–2010). It was the first time she had sung Emotions live in almost 10 years since the Rainbow World Tour (2000).

She sang "Emotions" on her The Elusive Chanteuse Show tour in 2014, as well as in her first annual Christmas show at the Beacon Theatre in New York City, All I Want For Christmas Is You, A Night of Joy & Festivity (2014). The song was also featured in Carey's Las Vegas residency, #1 to Infinity. For the performance, Carey entered the stage singing the MTV Unplugged version of the song, while Las Vegas showgirls danced on the stage.

On December 31, 2016, Carey attempted to sing "Emotions" during a live performance in Times Square for the television special Dick Clark's New Year's Rockin' Eve, but the performance was afflicted by technical issues that prevented her from hearing her backing track. Carey's management claimed that the producers of the program had refused to acknowledge the issue prior to her performance and had "set her up to fail," but these claims were denied by Dick Clark Productions. The song was also featured in Carey's Las Vegas residency, The Butterfly Returns. For the Caution World Tour in 2019, the song was part of a medley alongside "You Don't Know What To Do".

Track listings

 Worldwide CD single "Emotions"
 "Vanishing"

 US CD maxi-single "Emotions" (12" Club Mix)
 "Emotions" (12" Instrumental)
 "Emotions" (LP Version)
 "There's Got to Be a Way" (12" Mix)
 "There's Got to Be a Way" (Vocal Dub Mix)

 European maxi-single (1) "Emotions"
 "Vanishing"
 "Vision of Love"

 European maxi-single (2) "Emotions" (C&C Club Mix)
 "Emotions" (C&C 12" Club No. 1 Mix)
 "Emotions" (C&C Dub-Dub Mix)

 Emotions EP "Emotions" (Special Motion Edit) – 4:49
 "Emotions" (12" Club Mix) – 5:51
 "Emotions" (C&C 12" Club No. 1 Mix) – 7:44
 "Emotions" (C&C Dub-Dub Mix) – 5:45
 "Emotions" (12" Instrumental) – 5:05

Credits and personnel
Credits adapted from the liner notes of Emotions.Recording Recorded at Right Track Recording and Axis Studios, NYC.
 Mixed at Axis Studios, NYC.Personnel'
 Lyrics – Mariah Carey
 Music – Mariah Carey, David Cole, Robert Clivillés
 Production – Mariah Carey, David Cole, Robert Clivillés
 Programming – Alan Friedman (for YIPE!)
 Engineers – Acar S. Key, Bruce Miller
 Mixing – Bob Miller
 Keyboards – David Cole
 Drums – Robert Clivillés
 Vocal arrangement – Mariah Carey, David Cole
 Background vocals – Mariah Carey, Trey Lorenz, David Cole

Charts and certifications

Release history

See also
 List of Billboard Hot 100 number-one singles of 1991

References

Works cited
 

1991 singles
Mariah Carey songs
Billboard Hot 100 number-one singles
Cashbox number-one singles
Gospel songs
Songs written by Mariah Carey
RPM Top Singles number-one singles
Songs written by Robert Clivillés
Song recordings produced by Robert Clivillés
1991 songs
Songs written by David Cole (record producer)
Columbia Records singles
Sony Music singles
Songs involved in plagiarism controversies
Post-disco songs
Contemporary R&B songs